Rdeči Breg (in older sources Rudeči Breg) is a dispersed settlement in the Municipality of Lovrenc na Pohorju in northeastern Slovenia. It extends from the right bank of the Drava River in the Pohorje Hills and part of the settlement lies in the adjacent Municipality of Podvelka. The area is part of the traditional region of Styria. It is now included in the Drava Statistical Region.

References

External links
Rdeči Breg on Geopedia

Populated places in the Municipality of Lovrenc na Pohorju